Doosri Sita is a 1974 Bollywood drama film directed by Gogi Anand. It stars Jaya Bhaduri in lead role. The music was composed by R. D. Burman.

Cast 
Jaya Bhaduri as Seeta Wagle
Romesh Sharma as Ramesh
Raza Murad as Public Prosecutor
A. K. Hangal as Babulal Wagle
Satyendra Kapoor
Mohan Choti
Lalita Pawar

Crew 
Director – Gogi Anand
Producer – B. K. Khanna
Cinematographer – K. K. Mahajan
Editor – Madhu Sinha
Music Director – R. D. Burman
Lyricist – Gulzar

Music 
The music was composed by R.D.Burman with lyrics by Gulzar

External links 
 

1974 films
1970s Hindi-language films
1974 drama films
Films scored by R. D. Burman